Puntius ambassis is a species of ray-finned fish in the genus Puntius from India.

References 

ambassis
Taxa named by Francis Day
Fish described in 1869
Barbs (fish)